George David Weiss (April 9, 1921 – August 23, 2010) was an American songwriter and arranger, who was a president of the Songwriters Guild of America.

He is an inductee in the Songwriters Hall of Fame.

Biography

Weiss was born in a Jewish family, and originally planned a career as a lawyer or accountant, but out of a love for music he was led to attend the Juilliard School of Music, developing his skills in writing and arranging. After leaving school, he became an arranger for such big bands as those of Stan Kenton, Vincent Lopez, and Johnny Richards.

He was a prolific songwriter during the 1940s, 1950s, and 1960s, with many of his songs attaining high rankings on the charts. Although he worked with many collaborators, the largest proportion of his well-known songs were written with Bennie Benjamin.

Weiss contributed to a number of film scores: Murder, Inc. (1960), Gidget Goes to Rome (1963), Mediterranean Holiday (1964), and Mademoiselle (1966).

Collaborations on three Broadway musicals were among his compositions. Mr. Wonderful was written in 1956 with Jerry Bock and Larry Holofcener. The Broadway production starred Sammy Davis Jr. First Impressions was based on Jane Austen's Pride and Prejudice. It was written in 1959, with Bo Goldman and Glenn Paxton. Maggie Flynn was written in 1968, with Hugo Peretti and Luigi Creatore. It was set in New York during the American Civil War, and the Broadway production starred Shirley Jones and Jack Cassidy. In addition, Weiss and Will Severin composed the family musical, A Tale of Cinderella, which was first presented in December 1994 at the Theater Institute in Troy, New York, and filmed for presentation on PBS.

Weiss wrote the lyrics for the jazz standard "Lullaby of Birdland", which became a hit for Ella Fitzgerald. In 1984, Weiss was inducted into the Songwriters Hall of Fame.

In 2006, a court settlement was reached regarding royalties for the worldwide rights of the song "The Lion Sleeps Tonight," best known as a  1 hit for The Tokens, which was based on a 1939 song, "Mbube", by the South African musician Solomon Linda. The settlement, which operates worldwide and in settlement of all claims, encompasses the following:

Linda's heirs will receive payment for past uses of "The Lion Sleeps Tonight" and an entitlement to future royalties.
"The Lion Sleeps Tonight" is acknowledged as derived from "Mbube".
Solomon Linda is acknowledged as a co-composer of the song and will be designated as such.
A trust will be formed to administer the heirs' copyright and to receive on their behalf the payments due.

Death 
Weiss died at age 89 on August 23, 2010, of natural causes at his home in Oldwick, New Jersey.

Notable songs
 "Lullaby of Birdland" (1952) — under the pseudonym "B. Y. Forster", with music by George Shearing
 "Mr. Wonderful" (1955) — co-written by Jerry Bock and Lawrence Holofcener
 "The Lion Sleeps Tonight" (1961) — tune written by Solomon Linda in 1939; lyrics rewritten in 1961 by Weiss, Luigi Creatore, and Hugo Peretti, recorded by The Tokens
 "Can't Help Falling in Love" (1961) — co-written by Luigi Creatore and Hugo Peretti, recorded by Elvis Presley
 "That Sunday, That Summer" (1963) — co-written by Joe Sherman
 "Stay With Me" (1966) — co-written by Jerry Ragovoy, recorded by Lorraine Ellison
 "What a Wonderful World" (1968) — co-written by Bob Thiele, recorded by Louis Armstrong
 "Let's Put It All Together" (1974) — co-written by Luigi Creatore and Hugo Peretti, recorded by The Stylistics

References

External links
[ Biography at Allmusic.com]
George David Weiss Interview NAMM Oral History Library (1995)

1921 births
2010 deaths
Jewish American songwriters
Songwriters from New York (state)
Juilliard School alumni
Musicians from New Jersey
Musicians from New York City
People from Tewksbury Township, New Jersey
Songwriters from New Jersey
21st-century American Jews